Heroes in Blue may refer to:
 Heroes in Blue (1939 film), an American crime film
 Heroes in Blue (1927 film), an American silent drama film